The 2021 Zandvoort Formula 3 round was the sixth and penultimate race of the 2021 FIA Formula 3 Championship. It took place at the Circuit Zandvoort and featured three races on 4 September and 5 September in support of the 2021 Dutch Grand Prix.

Classification

Qualifying 

 Notes

  – Rafael Villagómez was forced to start from the pit lane in races one and three after missing the weighbridge in qualifying.

Sprint Race 1 

Notes

  – Kaylen Frederick received a grid penalty due to causing a collision with Juan Manuel Correaat the Red Bull Ring.

Sprint Race 2 

Notes

  – Filip Ugran originally finished 12th, but received a ten-second time penalty for a collision with Jonny Edgar.

Feature Race 

Notes
 † – Tijmen van der Helm and David Schumacher retired, but were classified as they completed over 90% of the race distance.
  – Ido Cohen was given a three-place grid drop for causing a collision with Dennis Hauger in race 2.
  – Juan Manuel Correa was given a ten-second time penalty after the race for causing a collision with Tijmen van der Helm.

Standings after the event 

Drivers' Championship standings

Teams' Championship standings

 Note: Only the top five positions are included for both sets of standings.

See also 
 2021 Dutch Grand Prix

References 

|- style="text-align:center"
|width="35%"|Previous race:
|width="30%"|FIA Formula 3 Championship2021 season
|width="40%"|Next race:

2021 FIA Formula 3 Championship
Zandvoort Formula 3
Zandvoort FIA Formula 3 round